MTV Oy (formerly Oy Mainos-TV-Reklam Ab) is a Finnish media company owned by Telia Company through TV4 Media (formerly known as Bonnier Broadcasting). The company owns the largest commercial television channel in Finland, MTV3.

On 20 July 2018, Telia Company announced the acquisition proposal of the Bonnier Broadcasting, which includes this company, for 9.2 billion SEK (roughly US$1 billion). The acquisition was completed on December 2, 2019.

Businesses 

MTV Oy operates the following television channels:
 MTV3
 MTV Sub, formerly TVTV!, Subtv and Sub
 MTV Ava, formerly MTV3 Ava and Ava
 C More Sport 1
 C More Sport 2
 C More Max, formerly MTV3 Max and MTV Max
 C More Juniori, formerly Subtv Juniori, Sub Juniori, MTV3 Juniori and MTV Juniori

References

External links
 MTV Oy

Mass media companies of Finland
Television in Finland
Finnish companies established in 1957